Carlo Tresca (March 9, 1879 – January 11, 1943) was an Italian-American newspaper editor, orator, and labor organizer who was a leader of the Industrial Workers of the World during the 1910s. He is remembered as a leading public opponent of fascism, Stalinism, and Mafia infiltration of the trade unions for the purposes of union racketeering.

Born, raised, and educated in Italy, Tresca was editor of an Italian socialist newspaper and secretary of the Italian Federation of Railroad Workers before he emigrated to the United States in 1904. After a three-year spell as secretary of the Italian Socialist Federation of North America, he joined the Industrial Workers of the World in 1912, and was involved in strikes across the United States over the rest of the decade. He was jailed in 1925 after printing a paid advertisement for a birth control pamphlet in one of his newspapers.

During the 1930s, Tresca was a vocal critic of both Benito Mussolini's Fascist government in his native Italy, and of Joseph Stalin and Communist Party of the Soviet Union. In 1937, he was a member of the Dewey Commission, which cleared Leon Trotsky of all charges made during the Moscow Trials. Tresca also used his newspapers to mount a public campaign criticising the Mafia. He was assassinated in New York, January 1943 allegedly by Carmine Galante.

Personal life
Carlo Tresca was born March 9, 1879, in Sulmona, Abruzzo, Italy, the son of a landowner. His formal education reached to secondary school. Tresca had no hope of attending university as his family's finances were poor during the economic slump of the 1880s. He enrolled at a seminary instead, but left soon after, emerging as an anticlerical atheist.

From 1898 to 1902, Tresca was secretary of the Italian Federation of Railroad Workers. He was also the editor of Il Germe, a socialist weekly based in Abruzzo. Seeking to avoid a jail term for his radical political activities, Tresca emigrated to the United States in 1904, settling in Philadelphia.

Tresca had a relationship with Elizabeth Gurley Flynn, and Flynn's sister, Bina, and was the father of Bina's son Peter D. Martin.  He also had a relationship with sculptor Minna Harkavy, whose bust of him was erected in his birth town of Sulmona.

American years
In America, Tresca was elected Secretary of the Italian Socialist Federation of North America in 1904. He remained in that position for the next three years. During this same interval, Tresca was also the editor of Il Proletario (The Proletarian), the official newspaper of the Italian Socialist Federation.

Tresca's political views became increasingly radical and he soon came to identify himself as an anarchist. In 1907 Tresca resigned as editor of Il Proletario and began publishing his own newspaper, La Plebe (The Plebeian). He would later transfer La Plebe to Pittsburgh and, with it, revolutionary ideas to Italian miners and mill workers in Western Pennsylvania. In 1909, Tresca became editor of L'Avvenire, (The Future) remaining in that capacity until the coming of World War I, when the publication was suppressed under the Espionage Act.

Tresca joined the revolutionary syndicalist Industrial Workers of the World (IWW) in 1912, when he was invited by the union to Lawrence, Massachusetts to help mobilize the Italian workers during a campaign to free strike leaders Joseph Ettor and Arturo Giovannitti, jailed on false murder charges. After the victorious strike in Lawrence, Tresca was active in several strikes across the United States; the Little Falls, New York textile workers' strike (1912), the New York City hotel workers' strike (1913), the Paterson silk strike (1913), and the Mesabi Range, Minnesota, miners' strike (1916). He was arrested several times and jailed for nine months awaiting trial for murder in conjunction with the Minnesota action, ultimately being released without going to trial.

In August 1920, Tresca became involved tangentially in the Irish War of Independence. As Sidney Czira, secretary of Cumann na mBan in New York, and sister of Grace Gifford, later recalled, "Picketing of the British Embassy in Washington had been going on from 1916 onwards and I remember a very successful picketing that was undertaken as a protest in New York against the British arrest of Dr. Mannix in August 1920. This latter picketing was largely the work of an Italian called Carlo Tresca, a personal friend of the well-known Irish-American family of Flynn, who were great friends of James Connolly. Tresca had great influence among the sea-faring fraternity and suggested that we should call out the seamen from the British ships as a protest against the arrest of Dr. Mannix. This was done by pickets walking on the docks with placards, calling on the men to leave the ships. So far as I was concerned, this was rather an amusing incident, because I had a placard which read something like this, "Hear the call of the blood and refuse to work on British ships". I realised that the call of the blood was addressed to Greeks, Italians, Lascars, etc., and when they saw a young woman with a placard they came up to enquire what the strike was about. My efforts to translate "Hear the call of the blood" into Italian were funny, but I found one word which they all seemed to know was "tyranny - Irlanda", and smiling and nodding, they would all walk away. The picketing was extremely effective because when we were holding our meetings it was a thrilling sight when, from time to time, we would hear the march of feet and the crew of some ship would come marching into the room. We found out subsequently that Tresca, who had organised them, was generally supposed to be an anarchist! Of course, there were extremely severe penalties under American law for behaviour of this kind."

In August 1923, Tresca was arrested on charges of having printed an advertisement for a birth control pamphlet in his new publication, Il Martello (The Hammer). He was found guilty in an October 1923 trial and was sentenced to a year and a day in Atlanta Federal Penitentiary. This sentence was confirmed on November 10, 1924, and Tresca entered prison on January 5, 1925.

Making enemies
Tresca became a prominent figure among Italian-Americans for his opposition to fascism and was reported to Benito Mussolini as a leading enemy of the fascist movement. Tresca edited an anti-fascist newspaper named Il Martello, where he attacked the myths that undergirded Mussolini's power. Tresca was monitored by the United States Department of Justice, who sought to deport him, and by Rome, where Mussolini feared that Italian-Americans would hurt his reputation with the United States and its banks. With pressure from the Italian ambassador to ban Tresca's newspaper, the American government charged Tresca with publishing obscenities. Tresca was sentenced and subject to deportation, but public dissent led the United States President Calvin Coolidge to commute Tresca's sentence. The fascists turned to violence, with a bombing assassination attempt in 1926, after which the antifascists fought back. Tresca contributed towards stopping Mussolini's ideological spread among Italian-Americans, despite Tresca's lack of reach into Italian-American media and business influence.

During the trial of Sacco and Vanzetti, Tresca organized publicity, fundraising, and the defense lawyer Fred Moore.

In the 1930s, Tresca became an outspoken opponent of Soviet communism and Stalinism, particularly after the Soviet Union had engineered the destruction of the anarchist movement in Catalonia and Aragon during the Spanish Revolution of 1936.

In 1937, Tresca was a member of the Dewey Commission, which cleared Leon Trotsky of all charges made during the Moscow Trials.

In early 1938, Tresca publicly accused the Soviets of kidnapping Juliet Stuart Poyntz to prevent her defection from the Communist Party USA underground apparatus. Tresca alleged that before she had disappeared, Poyntz had talked to him about "exposing the communist movement".

Assassination

On January 11, 1943, in New York City, Tresca was leaving his parole officer's offices when he dodged surveilling officers by jumping into a car that was waiting for him. Two hours later, Tresca was crossing Fifth Avenue at 15th Street on foot when a black Ford pulled up beside him. A short, squat gunman in a brown coat jumped out and shot Tresca in the back of the head with a handgun, killing him instantly. The black Ford was later found abandoned nearby with all four doors open. One theory at the time was that the suspected assassin was a member of the Mafia, acting on orders from Sicily. Others have theorized that Tresca was eliminated by the NKVD as retribution for criticism of the Stalin regime of the Soviet Union.

Vito Genovese, boss of the Genovese crime family, is said to have allegedly ordered the murder of Tresca, with the shooter allegedly being Carmine Galante of the Bonnano crime family. No one was ever charged in the Tresca murder.

A eulogy at his memorial service was delivered by Angelica Balabanoff, socialist activist and former Bolshevik. According to Lewis Coser's account of the funeral, "I was sitting near a burly Irish policeman who clearly didn't understand a word of Balabanoff's fierce Italian oratory. But at her climax he burst into tears."

See also
 List of unsolved murders

References

Bibliography 

 
 
 
 

1879 births
1943 deaths
1943 murders in the United States
American anarchists
American atheists
American birth control activists
American people of Italian descent
Assassinated American journalists
Assassinated newspaper editors
Deaths by firearm in Manhattan
Former Roman Catholics
Industrial Workers of the World leaders
Italian anarchists
Italian anti-fascists
Italian atheists
Italian emigrants to the United States
Italian socialists
Italian syndicalists
Italian trade unionists
Male murder victims
Murdered anarchists
People from Sulmona
People murdered by Italian-American organized crime
People murdered in New York City
Unsolved murders in the United States
Assassinated Italian journalists